ECIM is the debut album of Cul de Sac, released in 1991 through Capella.

Track listing

Personnel 
Cul de Sac
Robin Amos – synthesizers, sampler
Chris Fujiwara – bass guitar
Chris Guttmacher – drums, percussion
Glenn Jones – guitar, contraption

Production and additional personnel
Cul de Sac – production, mixing
Ruthie Dornfeld – fiddle on "The Moon Scolds the Morning Star" and "Lauren's Blues"
Dredd Foole – vocals on "Homunculus" and "Song to the Siren"
David Greenburger – design
Daved Hild – cover art
Phil Milstein – percussion on "Stranger at Coney Island"; tapes on "Nico's Dream" and "The Invisible Worm"
Sean Slade – recording
Jon Williams – mixing
Ed Yazijian – steel guitar on "Electar"

References

External links 
 

1991 debut albums
Cul de Sac (band) albums